The designation B.III was used for two completely unrelated aircraft produced by Fokker:

 A reconnaissance biplane, flown by Austria-Hungary during World War I
 A biplane flying boat, developed for the Dutch East Indies Naval Air Force in the 1920s

See also
 B3 (disambiguation)